Philip Clive Roderick Tufnell (born 29 April 1966) is a former English international cricketer and current television and radio personality. A slow left-arm orthodox spin bowler, he played in 42 Test matches and 20 One Day Internationals for the England cricket team, as well as playing for Middlesex County Cricket Club from 1986 to 2002. Tufnell took 121 Test match wickets. His Test average is 37.68 per wicket. Across all first-class cricket he took over 1,000 wickets at an average of 29.35. His cheerful personality and behaviour have made him a popular sports personality.

Following his retirement from playing cricket in 2002, Tufnell has built on his popularity with several television appearances, including They Think It's All Over, Celebrity Deal Or No Deal, A Question of Sport, Strictly Come Dancing, and winning I'm a Celebrity...Get Me Out of Here! in 2003.

Early life
Tufnell was educated at Highgate School where his cricketing prowess was recognised and he was appointed captain of the Junior School's First XI before reaching the top year. On leaving Highgate, he attended and played cricket for Southgate School. He then trained in quantity surveying and was faced with the decision of whether to play cricket professionally or to work as a quantity surveyor. He chose to do the former.

Cricket career

As a slow left-arm orthodox spin bowler, Tufnell played 42 Test matches and 20 One Day Internationals for England between 1990 and 2001, and 316 first-class matches, mainly for Middlesex. 
Tufnell occasionally produced remarkable performance, for example taking 11–93 against Australia at the Oval in 1997 (for which he won the Man of the Match award after England won by 19 runs) and seven wickets in the match (6-25 in the first innings) against the West Indies at the Oval in 1991,. He took his 121 Test wickets with a bowling average of 37.68 across his whole Test career. Mark Waugh theorised that "if you attack him, he can go on the defensive, and it puts him off his game", although Waugh was Tufnell's most frequent test victim, being dismissed a total of seven times by him, three of them bowled.

According to Michael Parkinson, a British talk show host, "at the age of nine he was opening the bowling and the batting for his club's junior team". Parkinson also believes that his "ordinary fielding made him a luxury in the view of the ... (English cricket) management (circa August 1996)". He was not at all an accomplished or confident batsman, often appearing particularly nervous and awkward at Test level, where he became regarded as the ultimate 'rabbit' number 11, Tufnell's fielding improved during his career. He was nicknamed "The Cat" due to his propensity to be found sleeping in the corner of dressing room. He also acquired the nickname "Two Sugars" due to his well-known love of tea. According to England teammate Mike Atherton, Tufnell smoked very heavily.

During his career spanning 16 years with Middlesex, Tufnell took 1,057 first-class wickets in the English game at an average of 29.35. His autobiography What Now ?   was published in 1999.

Tufnell received an honorary doctorate from Middlesex University on 20 July 2011 in recognition of his achievements in sport and the media.

Broadcasting career

Radio
Since 2003, Tufnell has appeared as a summariser on BBC Radio's Test Match Special. He has also hosted The Phil Tufnell Cricket Show and Tuffers and Vaughan Cricket Show on BBC Radio 5.

Television
Tufnell retired from professional cricket before the 2003 season in order to participate in the second series of the reality television show I'm a Celebrity... Get Me Out of Here! which he won. Prior to this, he had appeared on Lily Savage's Blankety Blank. He was a team captain on sports quiz show They Think It's All Over until 2005. In 2004, he made two guest appearances on British soap opera Family Affairs and co-presented the ITV game show Simply the Best with Kirsty Gallacher.

Tufnell was a team captain on the BBC One panel show A Question of Sport. He also makes regular appearances as a reporter on the BBC One magazine show The One Show.

On 12 April 2008, Tufnell and his wife Dawn appeared on the ITV game show All Star Mr & Mrs.

On 4 October and 1 November 2008, Tufnell appeared on the game show Hole in the Wall. In 2009, Tufnell competed in the seventh series of the BBC's Strictly Come Dancing, partnering professional dancer Katya Virshilas. The couple were eliminated in the ninth week.

On 7 October 2011, he appeared on the BBC One panel show Would I Lie To You?, where he claimed to have recurring dreams in which he is a potato, being chased by a pitchfork.

On 19 November 2011, Tufnell appeared on a celebrity edition of ITV quiz show The Chase.

In 2012, he co-presented The Flowerpot Gang with Anneka Rice and Joe Swift.

During the week of 12 to 16 May 2014, Tufnell appeared on the daytime Channel 4 game show Draw It!

On 1 February 2015, Tufnell competed in Get Your Act Together on ITV and The Jump on Channel 4.

In December 2018, Tufnell joined Australia's Seven Network as a guest commentator for their coverage of the BBL and Sri Lankan Test matches.

Books
Tufnell co-authored a humorous book, Phil Tufnell's' A To Z of Cricket with cricket journalist Adam Hathaway.

Personal life
He has been married three times, to Alison Squires (married 1986, divorced 1989), Lisa Bar (married 1994, divorced 1998), and Dawn Brown (married 2005).

Tufnell's first marriage to Alison Squires ended in 1989. He has two daughters: one with ex-girlfriend Jane McElvoy, and one with former wife Lisa Bar. Tufnell's personal life hit the headlines in 1994 when he was fined £800 after admitting assaulting his former girlfriend McElvoy, after she ended their relationship.

In 1997, while on a tour of New Zealand, reports emerged that he left a toilet cubicle trailing the scent of cannabis but this time he was exonerated. During divorce proceedings, Bar produced court documents accusing Tufnell of causing her to endure 'anxiety, stress and an eating disorder'. She also claimed he had continually harassed her and abused her. He is now married to Dawn and has a step daughter.

Tufnell is the president of a cricket charity – Cricket for Change. He is also an Ambassador of UK children's charity The Children's Trust for children with brain injury and neurodisability.

Tufnell is a fan of Arsenal Football Club.

References

External links

1966 births
Living people
People educated at Southgate School
Cricketers at the 1992 Cricket World Cup
Doping cases in cricket
England One Day International cricketers
England Test cricketers
English cricketers of 1969 to 2000
English cricketers
I'm a Celebrity...Get Me Out of Here! (British TV series) winners
Middlesex cricketers
People educated at Highgate School
Tufnell, Phill
Marylebone Cricket Club cricketers